Oleksiy Oleksiyovych Prokhorenkov (born 21 October 1971) is a former Ukrainian football player.

Honours
 A Lyga champion: 1999, 2000.

External links
 

1971 births
People from Dyatkovsky District
Living people
FC Dnipro Cherkasy players
Soviet footballers
Ukrainian footballers
FC Nyva Ternopil players
Ukrainian Premier League players
FC Krystal Chortkiv players
PFC Sumy players
FC Dynamo Moscow players
Ukrainian expatriate footballers
Expatriate footballers in Russia
Russian Premier League players
FBK Kaunas footballers
Expatriate footballers in Lithuania
FC Spartak Sumy players
Association football forwards
Sportspeople from Bryansk Oblast